Liopropomini is one of the five tribes in the subfamily Epinephelinae, the group including the groupers, which is part of the family Serranidae which also includes the anthias and the sea basses. They are found mainly in the Indo-Pacific region and in the Western Atlantic Ocean with a single species in the eastern Atlantic.

Genera
The following genera are included within the Liopropomini:

 Bathyanthias Günther, 1880
 Liopropoma Gill, 1861
 Rainfordia McCulloch, 1923

References

Epinephelinae
Fish tribes